Sandy (Scholtens) Hamilton is an American politician and real estate broker who represents the 99th district in the Illinois House of Representatives.

Born Sandy Scholtens, she is a graduate of Downers Grove North High School in Downers Grove, Illinois.

Prior to her foray into politics, Hamilton was a scholarship athlete and letter winner at the University of Illinois Urbana-Champaign, where she was a member of teams that won three Big Ten championships and advanced to the Final Four in 1987 and 1988. The Illini lost in the semifinals both years. There is a U of I coaches’ award named the Sandy Scholtens Award, which is given to the athlete who embodies work ethic, attitude and teamwork.

Hamilton was a successful high school volleyball coach at private Catholic school Sacred Heart-Griffin High School in Springfield from December 2012- May 2021. Her teams had 7 20-win seasons.

On December 30, 2021, she was selected by a committee of the Sangamon County Republican Party to serve the remainder of the term held by Mike Murphy, who resigned on November 30, 2021, to serve as president and CEO of the Greater Springfield Chamber of Commerce. Her term will expire in January 2023.

As of July 3, 2022, Representative Hamilton is a member of the following Illinois House committees:

 Appropriations - General Service Committee (HAPG)
 Appropriations - Higher Education Committee (HAPI)
 Financial Institutions Committee (HFIN)
 Insurance Committee (HINS)
 State Government Administration Committee (HSGA)
 Transportation: Vehicles & Safety Committee (HVES)

Hamilton is running for the new Illinois 48th State Senate seat as the Republican nominee against incumbent Democrat Doris Turner (politician).

References

External links

21st-century American politicians
Republican Party members of the Illinois House of Representatives
Living people
Year of birth missing (living people)